Burg Baiersdorf is a castle in Styria, Austria.

See also 

 List of castles in Austria

References 

This article was initially translated from the German Wikipedia.

Castles in Styria